Marco Corti (born 2 April 1986) is an Italian professional racing cyclist, who last rode for UCI Professional Continental team . He is the son of the former professional cyclist Claudio Corti.

References

External links

1986 births
Italian male cyclists
Living people
Cyclists from Bergamo